Charles Long may refer to:

Charles Long (ABSRA) (born 1945), founder of the America's Buffalo Soldiers Re-Enactors Association, convicted of manslaughter
Charles R. Long (1923–1951), United States Army soldier and Medal of Honor recipient
Charles G. Long (1869–1943), Assistant Commandant of the Marine Corps
Charles Long, 1st Baron Farnborough (1760–1838), English politician and connoisseur of the arts
Charles Edward Long (1796–1861), English genealogist and antiquary
Charlie Long (1938–1989), American football guard
Charles Wigram Long (1842–1911), British Member of Parliament for Evesham 1895–1910
Charles Edwin Long (1879–1953), American-born farmer and political figure in Saskatchewan, Canada
Charles L. Long (1851–1929), Massachusetts lawyer, judge and politician
Charles Long (priest) (1802–1875), Anglican priest
Charles D. Long (1841–1902), Michigan Supreme Court Justice
Charles H. Long (1926-2020), American Historian of Religion and Prominent African-American Scholar